Gosbank (Gosudarstvenny bank SSSR—the State Bank of the USSR) was the central bank of the Soviet Union and the only bank in the entire country from 1922 to 1991. Gosbank was one of the three Soviet economic authorities, the other two being "Gosplan" (the State Planning Committee) and "Gossnab" (the State Committee for Material Technical Supply). The Gosbank closely collaborated with the Soviet Ministry of Finance to prepare the national state budget.

Foundation

The foundation of the bank was part of the implementation of the New Economic Policy. On 3 October 1921, the All-Russian Central Executive Committee (VTsIK), passed a resolution for the founding of the State Bank of the Russian Soviet Federative Socialist Republic. This was followed by a similar resolution passed by Sovnarkom on 10 October 1921. It began operations on 16 November 1921. In February 1922 Lenin described the State Bank as "a bureaucratic paper game", comparing it to a Potemkin village in a letter to Aron Sheinman whom he accused of "Communist-mandarin childishness". In 1923 it was transformed into the State Bank of the USSR. It was placed under the jurisdiction of Narkomfin.
The Soviet state used Gosbank, primarily, as a tool to impose centralized control upon industry in general, using bank balances and transaction histories to monitor the activity of individual concerns and their compliance with five-year plans and directives.  Gosbank did not act as a commercial bank in regard to the profit motive.  It acted, theoretically, as an instrument of government policy.  Instead of independently and impartially assessing the creditworthiness of the borrower, Gosbank would provide loan funds to favored individuals, groups and industries as directed by the central government.

In 1931 Boris Berlatsky, a senior official of the State Bank was put on trial for wrecking as part of the 1931 Menshevik Trial.

Daughters or "bins of the motherland"
Beginning in 1921 in Paris and prior to his death, Leonid Krasin created the first state controlled Soviet overseas bank. It was one of five "daughter" banks or "motherland bins" or "bins of the motherland" which were established in Paris (1921) as the Commercial Bank for Northern Europe BCEN-Eurobank, in London as part of the Moscow Narodny Bank, in Vienna (1974) as the Donau Bank AG, in Frankfurt am Main as the Ost-West Handelsbank (OWH), and in Luxembourg (1974) as the East-West United Bank. In order to financially assist Communist Parties, anti-imperialism, and pro national liberation movements worldwide, these banks acted as subsidiaries or "daughters" to the "mother" bank or Gosbank, which was the central bank of Russian Soviet Federative Socialist Republic (Russia) from 1921-1922 and the Soviet Union from 1923-1991.

In 1992 after the end of the Soviet Union, the Paris daughter bank BCEN-Eurobank had bad loans with Cuba, Morocco, and Mauritania and received a "silver plater" infusion of capital from Gosbank through a "participatory credit" of $1080.2 billion in various currencies.

The former Communist Party of the Soviet Union (CPSU) funds flowed through these daughter banks to overseas locations during the 1990s looting of Russia.

After the collapse of the Soviet Union, these daughter banks were absorbed into the VTB network and are very closely associated with the Bank of Russia which was the successor to Gosbank.

Perestroika
As part of Mikhail Gorbachev's perestroika program, other banks were formed, including; "Promstroybank" (USSR Bank of Industrial Construction), "Zhilstoybank" (USSR Bank of Residential Construction), "Agrobank" (USSR Agricultural Bank), "Vneshekonombank" (USSR Internal Trade Bank), and "Sberbank" (USSR Savings Bank).  "Sberbank" continues to this day as one of Russia's largest banks, retaining senior ex-Gosbank personnel and most of the  present Russian government's banking business.

Senior executives
This is the list of the Chairmen of the Board of the State Bank.

The Chairman was appointed by the Premier of the Soviet Union.

See also
 Economy of the Soviet Union
 Sberkassa
 Sovzagranbank

Notes

References

External links
Soviet Banking System, Pekka Sutela, Answers.com (accessed 2012-08-02)
  

Banks of the Soviet Union
Former central banks
Defunct banks
Banks established in 1921
Banks disestablished in 1991
1923 establishments in the Soviet Union
Soviet state institutions